Land of the Midnight Fun is a 1939 Warner Bros. Merrie Melodies cartoon supervised by Tex Avery (credited as "Fred Avery"). The short was released on September 23, 1939.

Plot
A cruise to Nome, Alaska, starts with various cruise ship jokes: the ship pulls out of the harbor like a car, raising anchor also raises the front of the boat, the ship follows the coast by curving around it. On arrival, we see some local scenes: A penguin eats two fish, then is eaten by the third; the dogs of a dog sled stop (behind an iceberg) at a telephone pole; a timber wolf goes around shouting "Timber!" (even the wolf admits, "Gee, this is silly!"); two Eskimos rub noses: in preparation, the woman applies lipstick to her nose. Finally, an Eskimo nightclub (after all, the nights are six months long) features a rotoscoped ice skater. The ship leaves, and gets caught in the fog near New York City; when the fog clears, we see the ship is perched atop the World's Fair Trylon.

Home media
LaserDisc – The Golden Age of Looney Tunes, Volume 4, Side 7
DVD – Allegheny Uprising (USA 1995 Turner print included as a bonus)

References

External links

1939 animated films
1939 films
Merrie Melodies short films
Warner Bros. Cartoons animated short films
Films directed by Tex Avery
Films scored by Carl Stalling
1930s Warner Bros. animated short films